Qingyun Temple is a Buddhist temple located in Dinghu District, Zhaoqing, Guangdong, China.

History

Ming dynasty
The temple traces its origins to the former Lianhua'an, founded by Shi Zaisan in 1633 and would later become Qingyun Temple in 1636. In 1635, Shi Qihe was invited to serve as abbot. He supervised the construction of the temple.

Qing dynasty
In 1649, Emperor Yongli of the Southern Ming dynasty and his mother visited the temple.

In 1670, Shang Zhixiao, son of Shang Kexi, donated property to establish the dining hall, Drum tower and Bell tower.

Qingyun Temple was devastated by wars in 1860, during the Xianfeng era.

In 1893, in the reign of Guangxu Emperor, master Xianchun brought 5,048 volumes of sutras to the temple. Empress Dowager Cixi inscribed and honored the name "Wanshou Qingyun Temple".

Republic of China
A fire in 1916 destroyed most of the buildings.

In 1923, Sun Yat-sen visited the temple.

People's Republic of China
Qingyun Temple has been designated as a National Key Buddhist Temple in Han Chinese Area by the State Council of China in 1983.

Architecture
Qingyun Temple preserves the architectural style of the Qing dynasty. Main structures from the Hall of Skanda to the Hall of Pagoda are aligned with the central axis and divided into five courtyards. At the very front are Hall of Skanda, followed by the Mahavira Hall, and finally the Hall of Pagoda in the rear. On both sides of the central axis are Bell Tower, Drum Tower, Reception Hall, Pilu Hall, Buddhist Texts Library, Seven Buddha Hall and ring-rooms.

References

Buddhist temples in Zhaoqing
Buildings and structures in Zhaoqing
Tourist attractions in Zhaoqing
1636 establishments in China
17th-century Buddhist temples
Religious buildings and structures completed in 1636